Bite Me: Narrative Structures and "Buffy the Vampire Slayer" is a 2003 Australian academic publication relating to the fictional Buffyverse established by TV series, Buffy and Angel. The book is designed for Year 12 teachers/students teaching/studying Media Unit 3 (in the Australian education system).

Book description

The book concentrates on the narrative of the television series. Organized into two sections:

 set of definitions of narrative in film, in television series in general and in BtVS in particular
 geared towards classroom practice and gives information and strategies for teachers as well as suggestions for student activities and templates for worksheets: all very useful.

This book addresses, in an easily understood and user-friendly way, questions of narrative structure across long-running TV series.

Whilst concentrating on narrative, the book also deals with relating narrative structures with: audience pleasure, mise en scène, and the use of symbolism and metaphor.

Contents

External links
Mediaed.org.uk - Review of this book
Acmi.net - Includes synopsis and contents

Books about the Buffyverse
Australian non-fiction books
2003 non-fiction books